The 2016 Capri Watch Cup was a professional tennis tournament played on clay courts. It was the 19th edition of the tournament which was part of the 2016 ATP Challenger Tour. It took place in Naples, Italy between 4 April and 10 April 2016.

Singles main-draw entrants

Seeds

 1 Rankings as of March 21, 2016.

Other entrants
The following players received wildcards into the singles main draw:
  Salvatore Caruso
  Federico Gaio
  Gianluca Mager
  Stefano Napolitano

The following player received entry into the singles main draw as a special exempt:
  Alexandre Sidorenko

The following players received entry from the qualifying draw:
  Flavio Cipolla
  Dimitar Kuzmanov
  Julian Reister
  Alexey Vatutin

Champions

Singles

  Jozef Kovalík def.  Arthur De Greef, 6–3, 6–2

Doubles

  Gero Kretschmer /  Alexander Satschko def.  Matteo Donati /  Stefano Napolitano, 6–1, 6–3

External links
Official Website

Capri Watch Cup
Tennis Napoli Cup
2016 in Italian tennis